Bythinella pannonica is a species of small freshwater snail with an operculum, an aquatic gastropod mollusk in the family Hydrobiidae.

This species is also known as Sadleriana pannonica.

Distribution 
The distribution of this species is Western Carpathian.

It is found in Hungary and Slovakia.

References

Bythinella
Gastropods described in 1865
Taxonomy articles created by Polbot
Taxa named by Georg Ritter von Frauenfeld